Thomas B. Finley Law Office, also known as the J. F. Jordan Law Office, is a historic law office located at Wilkesboro, Wilkes County, North Carolina. It was built during the early 1880s, and is a small one-story frame building one room wide and two deep.  It has sawnwork bargeboards and decorative finials in the Carpenter Gothic style. It is owned by the Wilkes Heritage Museum.

It was listed on the National Register of Historic Places in 1982. The Thomas B. Finley House in North Wilkesboro was listed in 2008.

See also 
 Alfred Moore Scales Law Office: NRHP listing in Madison, North Carolina
 Brown-Cowles House and Cowles Law Office: NRHP listing also in Wilkesboro, North Carolina
 Archibald Henderson Law Office: NRHP listing in Salisbury, North Carolina
 Nash Law Office: NRHP listing in Hillsborough, North Carolina
 Zollicoffer's Law Office: NRHP listing in Henderson, North Carolina
 National Register of Historic Places listings in Wilkes County, North Carolina

References

External links
Wilkes Heritage Museum website

Office buildings on the National Register of Historic Places in North Carolina
Carpenter Gothic architecture in North Carolina
Buildings and structures in Wilkes County, North Carolina
National Register of Historic Places in Wilkes County, North Carolina
Law offices
Legal history of North Carolina
Museums in Wilkes County, North Carolina